The 2018 Charleston Southern Buccaneers football team represented Charleston Southern University as a member of the Big South Conference during the 2018 NCAA Division I FCS football season. Led by Mark Tucker in his second and final season as head coach, the Buccaneers compiled an overall record of 5–6 with a mark of 3–2 in conference play, placing third in the Big South. Charleston Southern played home games at Buccaneer Field in Charleston, South Carolina.

Previous season
The Buccaneers finished the 2017 season 6–5, 3–2 in Big South play to finish in third place.

Preseason

Big South poll
In the Big South preseason poll released on July 23, 2018, the Buccaneers were predicted to finish in third place.

Preseason All-Big South team
The Big South released their preseason all-Big South team on July 23, 2018, with the Buccaneers having seven players selected along with three more on the honorable mention list.

Offense

Kameron Brown – WR

Defense

Solomon Brown – DL

Johnny Robinson – DL

J.D. Sosebee – LB

Shadarius Hopkins – DB

Special teams

Kyle Reighard – P

Taz Lindsey – PR

Honorable mention

Brandon Rowland – DB

Tyler Tekac – K

Ethan Ray – LS

Schedule

Game summaries

at Florida

Elon

at Hampton

at Savannah State

Virginia–Lynchburg

Presbyterian

Kennesaw State

at Monmouth

Gardner–Webb

at Campbell

at The Citadel

References

Charleston Southern
Charleston Southern Buccaneers football seasons
Charleston Southern Buccaneers football